Sebald can refer to:
Saint Sebaldus of Nuremberg
W. G. Sebald (1944–2001), German academic and writer
William J. Sebald (1901–1980), American diplomat
Sebald Beham (1500–1550), German printmaker

See also
 Seabold
 Sebold (disambiguation)
 Seibold
 Siebold
Surnames from given names